The 2012 Maidstone Borough Council elections took place on Thursday 3 May 2012 to elect members of Maidstone Borough Council in Kent, England. One third of the council (19 seats) were scheduled for election, whilst an additional vacancy caused by the resignation of a sitting councillor was also filled in Heath ward, meaning a total of 20 of the borough’s 55 seats were elected.

Election result

Ward results

References

2012 English local elections
2012
2010s in Kent